Dasan McCullough (born March 7, 2003) is an American college football outside linebacker for Oklahoma Sooners. He previously played for the Indiana Hoosiers.

Early life and high school career
McCullough initially attended Blue Valley North High School in Overland Park, Kansas while his father was the running backs coach for the Kansas City Chiefs. He moved to Bloomington, Indiana before the start of his senior year after his father was hired to coach at the University of Indiana and transferred to Bloomington High School South. McCullough was named first team All-State after recording 55 tackles, three sacks, six for loss, and two interceptions. He was rated a four-star recruit and initially committed to play college football at Ohio State entering his junior year of high school. At the end of the year, McCullough decommitted and flipped his commitment to Indiana. His commitment made him the highest-rated recruit in Indiana's history.

College career

Indiana 
McCullough joined the Indiana Hoosiers as an early enrollee in January 2022. He was named honorable mention All-Big Ten Conference as a true freshman after recording 49 tackles, 6.5 tackles for loss, four sacks, and three passes broken up. McCullough entered the NCAA transfer portal following the end of his freshman season.

Oklahoma 
McCullough committed to transfer to Oklahoma.

Personal life
McCullough's father, Deland McCullough, played running back in the National Football League and the Canadian Football League before entering coaching. His grandfather, Sherman Smith, is also a former NFL running back and coach. McCullough's older brother, Deland II, plays football at Indiana while his younger brother, Daeh, plays at Cincinnati.

References

External links
Indiana Hoosiers bio

Living people
Players of American football from Ohio
American football linebackers
Indiana Hoosiers football players
2003 births